Jovan Dejanović (15 June 1927 – 1 June 2019) was a Serbian politician and former Mayor of the city of Novi Sad in two terms. He is remembered for a number of capital investments during his rule, including the building of Liberty Bridge, Serbian National Theatre, SPC Vojvodina and others.

References

1927 births
2019 deaths
Mayors of Novi Sad
Serbian politicians